Jason Jean Luc Buaillon (born 5 October 1991) is a French footballer who plays for Louhans-Cuiseaux as a left back or defensive midfielder.

Club career
Born in Le Mans, Buaillon graduated from Le Mans FC's youth system, and made his professional debut on 29 July 2011, starting in a 0–1 loss at AC Arles Avignon for the Ligue 2 championship. He scored his first goal on 6 April of the following year, netting his side's second of a 3–1 win at RC Lens.

On 21 November 2013 Buaillon agreed a move to FC Sion, being effective in January of the following year. He appeared in only three matches for the Swiss side (169 minutes of action), which finished eighth.

On 30 June 2014 Buaillon signed a three-year deal with Standard Liège, being subsequently loaned to AD Alcorcón. However, after being deemed surplus to requirements by manager José Bordalás, he moved to Paris FC also in a temporary deal.

In June 2015 Buaillon signed for Vendée Luçon Football. However, the club filed for bankruptcy at the end of the 2015–16 season, and he was released, before signing for Créteil.

References

External links

SO Foot profile 

1991 births
Living people
Footballers from Le Mans
French footballers
Association football defenders
Association football midfielders
Association football utility players
Le Mans FC players
Paris FC players
FC Sion players
AD Alcorcón footballers
Luçon FC players
US Créteil-Lusitanos players
Louhans-Cuiseaux FC players
Ligue 2 players
Championnat National players
Championnat National 2 players
Championnat National 3 players
Swiss Super League players
French expatriate footballers
French expatriate sportspeople in Switzerland
Expatriate footballers in Switzerland
French expatriate sportspeople in Spain
Expatriate footballers in Spain